This is a list of 55 genera in the family Oedemeridae, false blister beetles.

Oedemeridae genera

 Alloxantha Seidlitz, 1899 g
 Ananca Fairmaire and Germain, 1863 i c g
 Anisochroa Semenov, 1900 g
 Anisochrodes Svihla, 1983 g
 Anogcodes Dejean, 1834 g
 Asclera Stephens, 1839 i c g b
 Ascleranoncodes Pic, 1915 g
 Baculipalpus Broun, 1880 g
 Calopus Fabricius, 1775 i c g b
 Chitona W.Schmidt, 1844 g
 Chitonoidea Svihla, 1983 g
 Chrysanthia Schmidt, 1846 g
 Colobostomoides Svihla, 1983 g
 Colobostomus Fairmaire, 1886 g
 Copidita LeConte, 1866 i c g b
 Dityloidea Fairmaire & Germain, 1863 g
 Ditylus Fischer, 1817 i c g b
 Dryopomera Fairmaire, 1897 g
 Eobia Semenov, 1894 g
 Eumecoleus Haupt, 1950 g
 Eumecomera Arnett, 1951 i c g b
 Ganglbaueria Semenov, 1891 g
 Heliocis Arnett, 1951 i c g b
 Hypasclera Kirsch, 1866 i c g b
 Hyperopselaphus Mizota, 1999 g
 Indasclera Svihla, 1980 g
 Ischnomera Stephens, 1832 g
 Matusinhosa Pic, 1923 g
 Micronacerdes Pic, 1923 g
 Nacerdes Dejean, 1834 i c g b
 Nacerdochroa Reitter, 1893 g
 Nacerdochroides Svihla, 1986 g
 Necromera Martynov, 1926 g
 Nerdanus Fairmaire, 1897 g
 Oedemera Olivier, 1789 g
 Opsimea Miller, 1880 g
 Oxacis LeConte, 1866 i c g b
 Oxycopis Arnett, 1951 i c g b
 Paloedemera Wickham, 1914 g
 Parisopalpus Hudson, 1975 g
 Paroxacis Arnett, 1951 i c g b
 Polacus  g
 Polypria  b
 Probosca W.Schmidt, 1846 g
 Pselaphanca  g
 Rhinoplatia Horn, 1868 i c g b
 Schistopselaphus Fairmaire, 1896 g
 Sessinia Pascoe, 1863 i c g
 Sisenes Champion, 1889 i c g b
 Sparedrus Dejean, 1821 i c g b
 Stenostoma Latreille, 1810 g
 Thelyphassa Pascoe, 1876 i c g
 Vasaces Champion, 1889 i c g b
 Xanthochroa Schmidt, 1846 i c g b
 Xanthochroina Ganglbauer, 1881 i c g b

Data sources: i = ITIS, c = Catalogue of Life, g = GBIF, b = Bugguide.net

References

Lists of insect genera